The Greater Chennai Metropolitan Area, or simply the Chennai Metropolitan Area (CMA), is the third-most populous metropolitan area in India, the 22nd-most in Asia, and the 40th-most in the world. The CMA consists of the core city of Chennai, which is coterminous with the Chennai district, and its suburbs in Kanchipuram  (except Uthiramerur taluk), Chengalpattu (except Madurantakam and Cheyyur taluks), Thiruvallur (except Pallipattu, RK Pet and parts of Tiruttani taluks), and Ranipet (parts of Arakkonam taluk) districts. The Chennai Metropolitan Development Authority (CMDA) is the nodal agency that handles town planning and development within the metro area. Since 1974, an area encompassing  around the city has been designated as the CMA and the CMDA has been designated as the authority to plan the growth of the city and the area around it.

Economy 

Recent estimates of the economy of the Chennai metropolitan area (which includes the industrial zones) is over US$200 billion (PPP GDP), making it  the third most productive metro area of India, and the third highest by GDP per capita. Previously, the metropolitan area didn't include the nearby industrial zones of Siruseri, Oragadam, and Sriperumbudur, due to which the economy of these regions didn't get included in the economy of Chennai. Now, post expansion of the Chennai metropolitan area in 2022, these regions are included, and the GDP of Chennai which was previously around US$86 billion has increased drastically to over US$200 billion.

Composition 

The CMA is a metropolitan area in Tamil Nadu state, consisting of the state capital Chennai (previously known as Madras) and its satellite towns. Developing over a period of about 20 years, it consists of 2 municipal corporations, 7 municipalities and 14 smaller town councils. The entire area is overseen by the Chennai Metropolitan Development Authority (CMDA), a Tamil Nadu State Government organisation in charge of town planning, development, transportation and housing in the region. The CMDA was formed to address the challenges in planning and development of integrated infrastructure for the metropolitan region. The areas outside Greater Chennai Corporation (Chennai District) like Kanchipuram, Chengalpattu and Tiruvallur have lacked organised development.

The CMA comprises the city of Chennai and its neighbourhood corporations of Avadi and Tambaram, 8 municipalities, 11 town panchayats and 179 village panchayats in 10 panchayat unions. The CMA has an area of 1,189 km2. It includes the whole of the Chennai District, along with the Ambattur, Gummidipoondi, Madhavaram, Ponneri, Poonamallee and Tiruvallur taluks of the Tiruvallur District, Sriperumbudur and Kundrathur taluks of the Kancheepuram District, Pallavaram, Vandalur and Tambaram taluks of the Chengalpattu district.

The CMA falls in three Districts of the Tamil Nadu State viz. Chennai District, part of Thiruvallur District, part of Chengalpattu District and part of Kancheepuram District. The extent of the Chennai District (covered in Chennai Municipal Corporation area) is 426 km2 and comprises 55 revenue villages in 10 Taluks (viz. (i) Tondiarpet Taluk, (ii) Perambur Taluk, (iii) Purasawalkam Taluk, (iv) Egmore Taluk, (v) Mambalam Taluk, (vi) Guindy Taluk, (vii) Mylapore Taluk, (viii) Velachery Taluk, (ix) Aminjikarai Taluk and (x) Ayanavaram Taluk). In Thiruvallur District out of total district area of 3,427 km2, 637 km2 in Ambattur, Thiruvallur, Ponneri and Poonamallee taluks fall into the CMA. In Kancheepuram District out of 4,433 km2, 376 km2 in Tambaram, Sriperumbudur and Chengalpattu district fall in the metropolitan area.

CMA region has about 3,000 water bodies, most of which have been encroached upon by real estate dealers and small communities.

Nodal agencies

Municipal corporations 
Greater Chennai Corporation
Avadi Municipal Corporation
Kanchipuram Municipal Corporation
Tambaram Municipal Corporation

Municipalities 
Guduvancheri
Mangadu
Kundrathur
Poonamallee
Thiruverkadu
Thiruninravur
Tiruvallur
Tiruttani
Maraimalai Nagar
Chengalpattu
Ponneri
Arakkonam

Districts 
Chennai (Complete)
Chengalpattu (Except Madurantakam and Cheyyur taluks)
Kanchipuram (Except Uthiramerur taluk)
Tiruvallur (Except Pallipattu, RK Pet & parts of Tiruttani taluks)
Ranipet (Parts of Arakkonam taluks)

Taluks 

The CMDA has proposed to trifurcate the CMA into Central, North and South.

CMA Central 

The former jurisdiction of CMA covering 1,189 sqkm would be juridiction the CMA Central which spread over the below areas:

In Chennai district
Alandur
Ambattur
Aminjikarai
Ayanavaram
Egmore
Guindy
Madhavaram
Maduravoyal
Mambalam
Mylapore
Perambur
Purasawalkam
Sholinganallur
Thiruvottiyur
Tondiarpet
Velachery

In Chengalpattu district
Pallavaram
Tambaram
Vandalur (partial)

In Kanchipuram district
Kundrathur (partial)

In Tiruvallur district
Avadi
Poonamallee (partial)
Ponneri (partial)

CMA North 

The proposed CMA North will cover an area of 2,908 sqkm which spread over the below areas:

In Tiruvallur district
Gummidipoondi
Poonamallee (partial)
Ponneri (partial)
Tiruvallur
Tiruttani (partial)
Uthukottai

In Kanchipuram district
Sriperumbudur

In Ranipet district
Arakkonam (partial)

CMA South 

The proposed CMA South will cover an area of 1,809 sqkm which spread over the below areas:

In Chengalpattu district
Chengalpattu
Tirukalukundram
Thiruporur
Vandalur (partial)

In Kanchipuram district
Kundrathur (partial)
Kanchipuram
Walajabad

Expansion 

The CMDA regulates developments in the Chennai metropolitan area through the issuance of planning permission under section 49 of the Tamil Nadu Town and Country Planning Act 1971.

The first plans to expand the CMA were proposed by the CMDA in 2011. The need for expansion arose as several nearby settlements such as Sriperumbudur, Kelambakkam, Tiruvallur and Maraimalai Nagar had been undergoing rapid development and had to be incorporated under the CMDA planning strategy. Also, the planning bodies of other metropolises in India such as Bengaluru, New Delhi and Hyderabad had already redefined their respective metropolitan regions to include much larger areas and corresponding regional planning was being done. The CMA, however, has not been altered since it was first defined in 1974.

In July 2012, the CMDA suggested two options to the Government of Tamil Nadu for expanding the area:

Chief planners of the CMDA have suggested that the second option is more feasible. Another planning model, similar to the National Capital Region was also examined by the CMDA. In order to plan for balanced regional development, developing a larger road network, implementing an integrated transport plan and identifying a Chennai Mega Region have become necessary.

The extension will cover all of Kancheepuram and Tiruvallur districts and Arakkonam taluk of Ranipet district, as proposed in July 2012. Having completed a feasibility study, a "strategic regional plan" was now required, and completion of the whole process was expected by July 2018.

On 22 January 2018 the Government of Tamil Nadu issued order G.O. (Ms) No.13 to "declare the intention to include additional areas in the Chennai Metropolitan Planning Area" under section 2, clause (23-a) of the Tamil Nadu Town and Country Planning Act, 1971 (Tamil Nadu Act 35 of 1972). The additional areas to be included were as proposed by the CMDA in 2017. Under Tamil Nadu Act 35 the Tamil Nadu government is required to allow reasonable opportunity (two months according to §10.3) for inhabitants, local authorities and institutions in the area to comment upon or object to such an expansion proposals.
Although less than 100 objections to the expansion plans were received, a public interest litigation action was launched at the Madras High Court in March 2018.

In October 2022 the area of CMA was expanded five-fold to  making it 4th largest Metropolitan city.

Notes

See also

 Mumbai metropolitan area
 Delhi metropolitan area
 Kolkata metropolitan area
 List of metropolitan areas in Asia by population
 List of metropolitan areas in India
 List of million-plus urban agglomerations in India
 List of districts in Tamil Nadu by Human Development Index
 List of urban agglomerations in Tamil Nadu

References

External links
Chennai metropolitan area map
CDMA plan

Metropolitan areas of Tamil Nadu
Geography of Chennai